Herman Schatz, Sr. (December 26, 1843 – June 28, 1906) was an American politician and blacksmith.

Born in Greifenberg, Germany, Schatz emigrated with his parents to the United States in 1851. Schatz lived in Watertown, Wisconsin, then in Cedarburg, Wisconsin, and then finally settled in Brookfield, Wisconsin. Schatz operated a hotel and blacksmith shop. During the American Civil War, Schatz served as a blacksmith in the Union Army. In 1882, Schatz served in the Wisconsin State Assembly and was a Democrat. Schatz died at his home in Brookfield, Wisconsin.

Notes

1843 births
1906 deaths
People from Gryfice
German emigrants to the United States
People from Brookfield, Wisconsin
People of Wisconsin in the American Civil War
American blacksmiths
Businesspeople from Wisconsin
19th-century American politicians
19th-century American businesspeople
Democratic Party members of the Wisconsin State Assembly